Merrimac may refer to:

Place names
 Merrimac, Queensland, Australia
 Electoral district of Merrimac

United States
 Merrimac, California
 Merrimac, Illinois
 Merrimac, Kentucky
 Merrimac, Massachusetts, the original town with the name "Merrimac"
 Merrimac, Virginia
 Merrimac, Mingo County, West Virginia
 Merrimac (town), Wisconsin, a town
 Merrimac, Wisconsin, a village
 Merrimack River, in Massachusetts and New Hampshire, of which Merrimac is an earlier spelling

Music
 "Merrimac", a song by the American band Bright from their self-titled album

See also
 Merrimac coup
 USS Merrimack, several, some spelled "Merrimac"
 Merrimack (disambiguation)
 Meramec (disambiguation)